The Chryse Alien is a crater in the Chryse Planitia on Mars, named because of its resemblance to an "alien head".

The crater is in a 712x935 image indexed as PIA07304. The picture was taken by the Mars Orbiter Camera on board the Mars Global Surveyor Orbiter.  The image was labelled Chryse "Alien Head" by NASA when it was published on 26 January 2004.  The image was part of the Jet Propulsion Laboratory's Photojournal, for 26 January 2005.

The image came to prominence in 2018, when it was rediscovered and proposed as evidence for life on Mars.

References

External links
 https://images.nasa.gov/details-PIA07304.html

Surface features of Mars